Mellow Out is the debut studio album of Mainliner, released in 1996 through Charnel Music.

Track listing

Personnel 
Adapted from the Mellow Out liner notes.
 Kawabata Makoto – electric guitar
 Hajime Koizumi – drums
 Asahito Nanjo – vocals, bass guitar, production

Release history

References

External links 
 

1996 debut albums
Charnel Music albums
Mainliner (band) albums